Senator Hosmer may refer to:

Andrew Hosmer (born 1964), New Hampshire State Senate
Stephen Hosmer (1763–1834), Connecticut State Senate